Prenzlau is a railway station in the town of Prenzlau, Brandenburg, Germany. The station lies on the Angermünde–Stralsund railway and the train services are operated by Deutsche Bahn and Niederbarnimer Eisenbahn (NEB).

Train services
The station is served by the following service(s):

Intercity-Express services (ICE 15) (Binz -) Stralsund - Eberswalde - Berlin - Erfurt - Frankfurt
Intercity-Express services (ICE 28) (Binz -) Stralsund - Eberswalde - Berlin - Leipzig - Jena - Nuremberg - Munich (- Innsbruck)
Intercity services (IC 32) Binz - Stralsund - Eberswalde - Berlin - Hanover - Dortmund - Essen - Duisburg - Düsseldorf - Cologne
Regional services  Stralsund - Greifswald - Pasewalk - Angermünde - Berlin - Ludwigsfelde - Jüterbog - Falkenberg - Elsterwerda
Local services  Prenzlau - Angermünde (- Eberswalde)

References

Railway stations in Brandenburg
Buildings and structures in Uckermark (district)
Railway stations in Germany opened in 1863